Vecpiebalga Municipality is a former municipality in Vidzeme, Latvia. It ceased to exist on 1 July 2021, as its territory was merged into Cēsis Municipality as Vecpiebalga Parish. The municipality was formed in 2009 by merging Dzērbene Parish, Ineši Parish, Kaive Parish, Taurene Parish and Vecpiebalga Parish; the administrative centre being Vecpiebalga. The population in 2020 was 3,555.

Population

See also 
 Administrative divisions of Latvia (2009)

References 

 
Former municipalities of Latvia